Jillian Shirley Segal  is an Australian lawyer and business executive. She is known for her contributions on the boards of government, commercial and non-profit organisations.

Early life and education 
Segal was born in Johannesburg, South Africa. Moving to Sydney, Australia, she completed her education at Kambala School in 1973. She then graduated from the University of New South Wales with a BA/LLB and won the University Medal in Law in 1979. Segal received an LLM from Harvard Law School.

Career 
Segal's first job was associate to Sir Anthony Mason, judge in the High Court of Australia. She joined Allen, Allen and Hemsley as a senior associate and was promoted to partner, before leaving to serve as a commissioner and subsequently deputy chair of the Australian Securities & Investments Commission.

From 2003 to 2015 she was on the board of the Australian Securities Exchange and from 2004 to 2016 on the board of the National Australia Bank. She served on the Council of the Australian War Memorial from 2014 to 2017 and was deputy chancellor of the University of New South Wales from 2010 to 2019.

Since 2008 Segal has been chairman of the General Sir John Monash Foundation that administers the John Monash Scholarships. She has served on the board of the Sydney Opera House Trust since 2014.

Segal was appointed a Member of the Order of Australia in the 2005 Queen's Birthday Honours for "service to business law in Australia, particularly in the areas of financial services reform and market regulation, and to the community through a range of organisations". She was promoted to Officer of the Order of Australia in the 2019 Australia Day Honours for "distinguished service to the banking and financial regulation sectors, to not-for-profit organisations, and to women".

As of 2022 Segal is a community representative on the Council for the Order of Australia. She has been a board member of the Garvan Institute since 2009.

References 

Living people
Year of birth missing (living people)
University of New South Wales alumni
Harvard Law School alumni
Australian women lawyers
21st-century Australian businesspeople
Officers of the Order of Australia